Hi-C is a fruit juice-flavored drink made by the Minute Maid division of The Coca-Cola Company. It was created by Niles Foster in 1946 and released in 1947.  The sole original flavor was orange.

History 

Niles Foster, a former bakery and bottling plant owner, created Hi-C in 1946. It took Foster over a year to develop the ideal formula for Hi-C orange drink, containing orange juice concentrate, peel oil and orange essences, sugar, water, citric acid and ascorbic acid (vitamin C). The name "Hi-C" referred to its high vitamin content. Hot-packed in enamel-lined 56-ounce (1.66 L) cans, the product needed no refrigeration before opening. After test marketing in 1947, Hi-C orange drink was introduced in 1948 with a massive promotional effort, spending thousands of dollars weekly per market on promotions. Foster entered into an agreement with Clinton Foods, Inc., to produce and market Hi-C, with Foster managing the Hi-C business.

Originally marketed in the southern United States, Hi-C was introduced into the Los Angeles and San Francisco markets in 1949. As markets for Hi-C were expanded nationwide, so were the contract operations, strategically located near major market areas. The multi-plant system facilitated quick product shipping, minimizing out-of-date merchandise problems. New flavors of Hi-C fruit drinks were developed as an outgrowth of the contract packer system. Grape, the second flavor introduced, evolved naturally from the fact that the Geneva, Ohio, co-packer was also processing fresh grapes. Apple and cherry drinks were introduced as a result of the fresh fruit processing operations at the Paw Paw, Michigan, co-packer plant. The contract packing concept is still used today by the Coca-Cola Foods Division. As the Hi-C business continued to grow, it attracted the attention of the Minute Maid Corporation, and in 1954 Clinton Foods, Inc., sold its Florida holdings, including Hi-C fruit drinks, to Minute Maid. Niles Foster left the Minute Maid Corporation shortly after the Hi-C brand was purchased. George Roberts, assistant sales manager for Niles Foster when Hi-C was introduced, stayed on, first as National Sales Manager for Hi-C, then later as Director of Contract Packer Operations for the Houston, Texas, based Coca-Cola Foods Division, ensuring the successful marketing, promotion, and distribution of Hi-C. The Hi-C business continued to expand with new flavors (orange-pineapple, pineapple-grapefruit, Florida Punch, peach) and innovative marketing techniques. By 1958, Hi-C fruit drinks had become an American supermarket staple, available in every grocery store nationwide.

Product lines

Hi-C is currently sold in drink boxes, soda fountains, and drink mix form. There are other flavors at Coca-Cola Freestyle. There were soft frozen versions of Flashin' Fruit Punch and Orange Lavaburst made by J & J Snack Foods and could be found in stores like Dollar Tree. At one point in time, Brach's made fruit snacks and orange slices under the Hi-C name. Subsequent growth of the Hi-C product line included globalization to selected markets worldwide.

The Hi-C products used to be the color implied by their flavor, but in 2000, Hi-C in juice boxes was re-introduced as a yellowish clear beverage that would not stain clothing. Thus, flavors like Shoutin' Orange Tangergreen lost their distinctive colors.  The soda fountain versions of Fruit Punch, Poppin' Pink Lemonade and Orange Lavaburst, however, still retain their red, pink and orange colors, respectively. There also is a "light" version of Flashin' Fruit Punch that exists for soda fountains. In 2013, the size of the juice boxes was slightly reduced from 6.75 fl oz (200 mL) to 6 fl oz. Starting in 2017, a new logo for the brand has been rolled out. In early 2019, new packaging was released for the drink boxes, and the calories and sugar have been reduced in half by using a new sweetener. In 2020, Jel Sert started producing Hi-C in drink mix form.

Drink boxes 
 Flashin' Fruit Punch (Blend of orange and pineapple juices)
 Orange Lavaburst (Blend of orange and pear juices)
 Torrential Tropical Punch (Blend of orange and pineapple juices)
 Boppin' Strawberry (Blend of pear and strawberry juices)
 Poppin' Lemonade
 Grabbin' Grape (Blend of pear and grape juices)
 Strawberry Kiwi Kraze (Blend of pear, apple, strawberry and kiwi juices)
 Blazin' Blueberry (Blend of apple, grape and blueberry juices)
 Wild Cherry (Blend of pear and cherry juices)
 Smashin' Wild Berry (Blend of apple, pear, blackberry, blueberry and raspberry juices)
 Ecto Cooler (discontinued)
 Candy Apple Cooler (discontinued)
 Double Fruit Cooler (discontinued)
 Hula Punch (discontinued)

Drink mixes 
 Flashin' Fruit Punch
 Grabbin' Grape
 Blazin' Blueberry
 Mashin' Mango Melon

Coca-Cola Freestyle 
 Cherry
 Fruit Punch
 Grape
 Lemon
 Orange
 Orange Vanilla
 Raspberry
 Raspberry Lime
 Strawberry
 Blueberry

Fountain 
 Flashin' Fruit Punch
 Orange Lavaburst
 Poppin' Pink Lemonade

Hi-C Blast (discontinued) 
 Berry Blue
 Blue Watermelon
 Fruit Pow
 Fruit Punch
 Orange Supernova
 Raspberry Kiwi
 Strawberry
 Strawberry Kiwi
 Wild Berry
 Wild Cherry

Ecto Cooler 
Ecto Cooler was a product tie-in with the cartoon series The Real Ghostbusters, based on the 1984 live-action film, Ghostbusters. It was a rebranded version of an earlier drink from Hi-C called Citrus Cooler, which had been on shelves as early as 1965 and continued to be sold until the rebranding to Ecto Cooler. Hi-C struck a deal in 1987 to promote the series by developing a drink. Expected to last only as long as the series, the drink was successful beyond expectations and continued after the series' 1991 cancellation to be produced for more than a decade. The Ecto Cooler box featured The Real Ghostbusters character Slimer, as did the commercials.

Slimer left the box sometime around 1997, but Minute Maid discontinued the product in 2001, at which point it was renamed Shoutin' Orange Tangergreen. Slimer was replaced on the packaging by a similar-looking blob of lips. The product was still noted as ecto cooler on many store receipts. In 2006, Shoutin' Orange Tangergreen was renamed Crazy Citrus Cooler. In 2007, Crazy Citrus Cooler was discontinued.

In April 2016, Coca-Cola announced that Ecto Cooler will return for a limited time, starting May 30, as part of a promotion with the rebooted Ghostbusters. A company spokeswoman said the new drink will have its original sweeteners simplified to just high fructose corn syrup, and other ingredients reduced so it "maintains the correct amount of tartness". Ecto Cooler was re-released on May 30, 2016. The color of the drink was green, the same as the original drink. When chilled, the drink's can changed from a dark green color to bright slime green. Ecto Cooler was met with major backlash from fans due to the limited availability of the drink. The limited edition can version of the drink was only available online at four sites including Amazon.com and H.E.B.  Neither could keep it in stock due to the overwhelming demand. For Amazon, stock was limited by region, making it much harder to purchase. The juice box version was even harder to find as it was shipped to only a handful of smaller grocery stores. A representative for the drink on the product's Facebook page informed fans that they needed to demand that their local store carry the product. By the end of the first week after going on sale, the drink was still very hard to find and was appearing on websites such as eBay for over $100 for a 12-pack. On Amazon, however, the drink was one of the most sold items. Physical Walmart stores as well as regional store Meijer carried them in stock.

In October 2016, the Ecto Cooler Facebook page announced that the drink would be again discontinued at the end of the year with a post saying "My eyes are welling up with green tears as I write this: #EctoCooler will be laid to rest at the end of this year #RIPEcto". Fans were urged to stockpile the drink while they still can; however, response to this news from fans was overwhelmingly negative considering the drink was never mass-produced or easy to find in stores during its May to December run. With the November 2021 release of Ghostbusters: Afterlife, a direct sequel to the original franchise, Ecto Cooler received an even more limited reissue. The 2021 reissue was not available for retail purchase, at all; the only way to acquire it was to win it by responding to official Hi-C and Ghostbusters-related social media posts or by buying it on the secondary market, where prices for a single 12-ounce bottle almost immediately reached the $200-$500 range.

McDonald's
In April 2017, headlines were made when McDonald's restaurants announced they were discontinuing Hi-C Orange Lavaburst from their beverage menu and replacing it with the carbonated Sprite TropicBerry flavor soda and Fanta as part of a new promotional deal with Coca-Cola. Social media was flooded with the comments of unhappy customers. In February 2021, McDonald's announced that Hi-C Orange Lavaburst will officially be returning to their menu by summer 2021.

In popular culture
Hi-C products appear in the film The Disorderly Orderly and Flamingo Road (film).

The Hi-C Ecto Cooler drink appears in Season 4 Episode 4 of the Adult Swim series Rick and Morty, and Episode 5 of the Disney+ series Loki. In the FX series The Bear season 1 episode "Dogs", Carmen makes a homemade version for a children's party- which is accidentally contaminated with Xanax.

References

External links

Historical packaging (Archived from the original on October 19, 2016)
Ecto Cooler Website

Coca-Cola brands
Products introduced in 1947
Fruit drinks